The Third Wave was an experimental social movement created by California high school history teacher Ron Jones in 1967 to explain how the German population could have accepted the actions of the Nazi regime during the rise of the Third Reich and the Second World War. 

While Jones taught his students about Nazi Germany during his senior level Contemporary World History class, Jones found it difficult to explain how the German people could have accepted the actions of the Nazis. He decided to create a fictional social movement as a demonstration of the appeal of fascism. Over the course of five days (or nine, according to student Sherry Toulsey), Jones, a member of the SDS, Cubberley United Student Movement sponsor and Black Panthers supporter – conducted a series of exercises in his classroom emphasizing discipline and community, intended to model certain characteristics of the Nazi movement.

As the movement grew outside his class and began to number in the hundreds, the experiment had spiraled out of control. He convinced the students to attend a rally where he claimed that the classroom project was part of a nationwide movement, and that the announcement of a Third Wave presidential candidate would be televised. Upon their arrival, the students were presented with a blank channel. Jones told his students of the true nature of the movement as an experiment in fascism, and presented to them a short film discussing the actions of Nazi Germany.

The project was adapted into an American film, The Wave, in 1981, and a critically acclaimed German film, Die Welle, in 2008.

Background to the Third Wave experiment
The experiment took place at Cubberley High School in Palo Alto, California, during the first week of April 1967. Jones, finding himself unable to explain to his students how the German people could have claimed ignorance of The Holocaust, decided to demonstrate it to them instead. Jones started a movement called "The Third Wave" and told his students that the movement aimed to eliminate democracy. The idea that democracy emphasises individuality was considered a drawback, and Jones emphasised this main point of the movement in its motto: "Strength through discipline, strength through community, strength through action, strength through pride."

Although the experiment was not well documented at the time, it was briefly mentioned in two issues of the Cubberley High School student newspaper, The Cubberley Catamount. Another issue of the paper has a longer account of the experiment at its conclusion. Jones wrote a detailed recollection of the experiment some nine years afterward. Subsequent articles by other authors followed, some featuring  interviews with Jones and the students involved.

Chronology

First day
The experiment began with simple alterations such as proper seating. He wrote "Strength Through Discipline" on the classroom's chalkboard, then enforced strict classroom discipline while speaking as to the importance of discipline. The procedures were simple. Students were expected to sit at attention before the second bell, had to stand up to ask or answer questions and had to do so in three words or fewer, and were required to preface each remark with "Mr. Jones". He drilled them on their adherence to these rules. Jones intended only a one-day experiment.

Second day
Jones decided to continue the experiment after observing his students' strict adherence to the previous day's rules. He added "Strength Through Community" to the chalk board, and named his "movement" "the Third Wave". Jones based the name of his movement on the supposed fact that the third in a series of waves is the strongest. Jones created a salute involving a cupped hand reaching across the chest toward the opposite shoulder, resembling a Hitler salute. He ordered class members to salute each other both in and outside of the class. Jones then assigned each of his students an individual assignment, such as designing a Third Wave banner, stopping non-members from entering the class, or recruiting their friends to join the movement.

Third day
The experiment had now taken on a life of its own. Students from across the school joined in. Class expanded from its initial 30 students to a total of 43. Jones added "Strength Through Action" to the chalkboard. Students were issued a member card. Jones instructed the students on how to initiate new members. By the end of the day the movement had over 200 participants. Jones instructed three students to report to him when other members of the movement failed to abide by the rules. He was surprised when around twenty of the students made such reports. The students proceeded to conduct trials for those thought to be not loyal enough to the movement, with punishment consisting of banishment to the school library.

Fourth day
Jones decided to terminate the movement, as it was slipping out of his control. The students had become more and more involved in the project. Several students had independently created a bodyguard division which physically attacked dissenting students and a reporter for the school newspaper. Jones announced to the class that this movement was a part of a nationwide movement and that on the next day a presidential candidate of the Third Wave would announce its existence to the public. He ordered students to attend a noon rally on Friday to witness the announcement.

Fifth and last day
The students all arrived at 11:50 a.m. Jones had convinced a number of his friends to pose as reporters, and asked the students to demonstrate what they had learned in the minutes before the televised address would supposedly begin. He then led them in shouting chants of "Strength through Discipline! Strength Through Community! Strength Through Action!" He turned on the TV placed in the middle of the room. Rather than a televised address of their leader, the students were presented with an empty channel. After a few minutes of waiting, Jones announced that they had been a part of an experiment in fascism and that they all had willingly created a sense of superiority, much as German citizens had done in the period of Nazi Germany. He then apologized to them for how far it all had gone, and played them a film about the Nazi regime to conclude the experiment.

Documentaries
Lesson Plan, which retold the story of the Third Wave through interviews with the original students and teacher, debuted at the Mill Valley Film Festival in 2010. It debuted on October 10 It was produced by Philip Neel and Mark Hancock, two of Jones's own former students.

A German documentary entitled The Invisible Line (Die Geschichte der Welle) debuted on television on December 19, 2019. This also featured interviews with Jones and former students.

Dramatizations
 The events of the experiment were adapted into a 1981 US TV special, The Wave. This formed the basis for the Young Adult novelization of the same name written by Todd Strasser, under the pseudonym of Morton Rhue. The special and novelization updated the setting to the modern day.
 It Can't Happen Here, the 86th book in the Sweet Valley Twins series, features a substitute teacher who conducts an experiment similar to The Third Wave. The title references a novel of the same name. 
 In 2001, a musical adaptation written by Olaf Pyttlik premiered at the Royal Manitoba Theatre Centre in Canada.
 The 2008 German film Die Welle transferred the experiment to a modern-day German classroom. The film received critical acclaim.
 "The Pride of Lakewood", a 2010 episode of children's animated series Arthur, was loosely based on the Third Wave experiment. In it, students who form a community pride group become fascistic.
 In 2010, Jones staged a musical called The Wave, written with some of the students in the class.
 The events were adapted into a non-musical play stage in 2011 by Joseph Robinette and Ron Jones.
In 2020, a Netflix miniseries called We Are the Wave premiered in Germany. The show is about high school students, and their own activism.

See also
Human experimentation in the United States

Notes

References

Further reading
 Klink, Bill. April 21, 1967. "The Third Wave presents inside look at Fascism", The Cubberley Catamount, Volume 11, No. 14, Page 3. (News article in Cubberley student newspaper, following the Third Wave Rally, including details regarding the rally and names of some individuals involved.)
 Leler, Robin and Sakuma, Bernice. April 7, 1967. The Cubberley Catamount, Volume 11, No. 13,  Page 2.  Column entitled "Through the Tiger Eye". (Article in Cubberley student newspaper makes brief reference to the events of the "Third Wave".)
 Strasser, T. 1981. The Wave. New York: Dell Publishing Co.
 Williams, Sylvia Berry. 1970. Hassling.  New York:  Little, Brown. Page 51 in Chapter 7 ("A Bill of Particulars on the USM").

External links
 The original essay by Jones (1976)
 Lesson Plan – Third Wave documentary film, as told by the original Third Wave students and teacher
  – story history, FAQ and links by original Third Wave students
 "Nazis für fünf Tage" ("Nazis for five days") in Der Spiegel 
 

Palo Alto, California
Nazism
Psychology experiments
Social influence
Human subject research in the United States